Valentine Holmes (born 24 July 1995) is an Australian professional rugby league footballer who plays across the backline as a  or er for the North Queensland Cowboys in the NRL and Australia at international level.

He began his career with the Cronulla-Sutherland Sharks in the National Rugby League, with whom he won the 2016 NRL Premiership. At representative level he has played for Queensland in the State of Origin series. In 2019, spent several months on the practice squad for the New York Jets of the National Football League (NFL) as a part of the league's International Player Pathway Program.

Background
Holmes was born in Townsville, Queensland to a Cook Islands mother and a New Zealand father.

He has three older brothers, and an older sister. 

He played his junior rugby league in Townsville for the Western Lions, before being signed by National Rugby League club, the Cronulla-Sutherland Sharks, in 2012 at the age of 17.

Rugby league career

Early career
Holmes moved to Sydney in 2013 to play for the Cronulla-Sutherland SG Ball Cup team. Later that year, he made his debut for the Sharks NYC team, scoring 17 tries in 10 games and played representative rugby league for the Queensland Under 18s team. In September 2013, Holmes, whose father is from New Zealand, was named in the 2013 Junior Kiwis train-on squad. In December 2013, Holmes was named in the 2014 Queensland Academy of Sport Under 20s Emerging Origin squad. Holmes played 33 games, scored 24 tries and kicked 53 goals for 202 points in his U20s career from 2013 to 2015.

2014
In February, Holmes was selected in the Cronulla Auckland Nines squad. On 6 August, he extended his contract with the Cronulla club from the end of 2015, to the end of 2017. In Round 23 against the Melbourne Storm at AAMI Park, Holmes scored his first NRL try in the 6–48 loss. Holmes finished his debut year in the NRL with him playing in 6 matches and scoring 3 tries. Holmes was named at wing in the 2014 NYC Team of the Year.

On 8 September, Holmes was named in the 2014 Junior Kangaroos train-on squad. A day later he was named in the New Zealand Kiwis train-on squad for the 2014 Four Nations. On 12 September, he pledged his allegiance to Australia. On 18 October, Holmes played on the wing for the Junior Kangaroos against the Junior Kiwis at Mt Smart Stadium, scoring two tries in the 14–15 loss.

2015
Holmes played for Cronulla-Sutherland in the 2015 NRL Auckland Nines. On 2 May, he again played on the wing for the Junior Kangaroos against the Junior Kiwis, scoring a try and kicking 1 goal in the 22-20 win. In Round 10 against the Gold Coast Titans, he kicked a field goal to win the match for Cronulla in their 23-22 golden-point extra-time victory at Cbus Super Stadium. In Round 19 against the Canberra Raiders, he repeated his efforts, kicking another field goal in extra-time to win the match 21-20. He finished off the season as Cronulla's highest try-scorer with 16 tries, as well as kicking 11 goals and 3 field goals in 25 matches.

2016
Holmes was selected in the QAS Emerging Maroons squad, but on 31 January, while in the Emerging Maroons camp, he broke curfew and was fined for public nuisance and obstructing Queensland Police. The QRL announced he would be excluded from its representative programs for the next 12 months. He was then stood down from the Sharks' 2016 NRL Auckland Nines squad after previously being named. In Round 10 against the Newcastle Knights, he scored 4 tries in Cronulla-Sutherland's 62-0 win. Holmes was part of the squad which won the 2016 NRL Grand Final, 14-12 against the Melbourne Storm. Holmes finished the season playing 23 games and scoring 19 tries, once again Cronulla's highest try scorer.

Holmes was later selected for the Australian test side to face New Zealand on 15 November. Holmes scored a try on debut for the Australians in his side's 26-6 win.

2017
Holmes was selected to play for Australia in the 2017 ANZAC Test. Later that season, he was selected to make his State of Origin debut for Queensland in Game II, scoring a try. He was then selected in Game III, where he scored three tries.

After being named in Australia's 2017 Rugby League World Cup squad, Holmes set a Test and World Cup record by scoring five tries in the quarter-final against Samoa in Darwin. Only a week later, he broke his own record by scoring six tries in the semi-final against Fiji at Suncorp Stadium. He set another record by scoring a total of twelve tries throughout the World Cup.

2018
In round 12 of the 2018 NRL season against the Newcastle Knights, Holmes scored a hat trick of tries in Cronulla's 48-10 win at Hunter Stadium. At the season's conclusion, Holmes was the second highest try-scorer and lead the season in highest amount of line-breaks. At the end of the season, Holmes won the Monty Porter Medal for Player of the Year and the Tommy Bishop Player's Player Award.

In November 2018, Holmes was released from his contract with the Cronulla-Sutherland Sharks in the National Rugby League to chase his dream to one day play in the National Football League. Two years earlier, Holmes and North Queensland Cowboys forward Jason Taumalolo attended NFL trials in Los Angeles, with fifteen NFL teams expressing interest in both.

2020
On 24 November 2019, Holmes returned to rugby league, signing a six-year deal with the North Queensland Cowboys, beginning in 2020.

In Round 1 of the 2020 NRL season, he made his debut for North Queensland in their 21–28 loss to the Brisbane Broncos. He scored the team's first try in the game, becoming the first Cowboys player to score a try at Queensland Country Bank Stadium. In Round 5, Holmes injured his ankle in a loss to the New Zealand Warriors, which ruled him out for two weeks.

In his second game back from injury, a 16–42 loss to the Sydney Roosters, Holmes reinjured his ankle and missed seven weeks. He returned from injury in Round 16, against his former club, the Cronulla-Sutherland Sharks. In Round 17, Holmes kicked the winning field goal in golden point to defeat the St. George Illawarra Dragons 23–22 and snap North Queensland's nine-game losing streak.

In the final game of the season, a 32–16 win over Brisbane, Holmes was charged by the match review committee for a shoulder charge and was suspended for one game. On 7 October 2020, he was named in the Queensland squad for the 2020 State of Origin series. In Game 3, Holmes started on the wing for Queensland, scoring a try and kicking four goals, in their series-deciding win.

2021
In round 9 of the 2021 NRL season, Holmes kicked the winning field goal for North Queensland as they defeated arch-rivals Brisbane 19-18. In round 12, Holmes kicked another winning field goal as North Queensland defeated the New Zealand Warriors 29-28.

On 30 May, Holmes was named in the Queensland squad for the 2021 State of Origin Series. He was named on the wing before an injury to Kalyn Ponga forced him into the fullback role for the 50-6 loss to New South Wales.

2022
In June, Holmes was selected for game one of the 2022 State of Origin series by Queensland.  In round 15 of the 2022 NRL season, he scored two tries in North Queensland's come from behind win over Manly. In round 19, Holmes kicked a penalty goal after the siren to win the match for North Queensland against the Wests Tigers by 27–26.

In round 25, Holmes scored a hat-trick in North Queensland's 38-8 victory over a second string Penrith outfit.
In the 2022 Qualifying Final, Holmes kicked a two-point drop goal in extra-time as North Queensland defeated Cronulla-Sutherland 32-30.

Holmes would play a total of 24 matches for North Queensland throughout 2022 including the clubs shock preliminary final loss to Parramatta at the Queensland Country Bank Stadium.  Holmes finished as the competitions top point scorer with 244 points.

In October he was named in the Australia squad for the 2021 Rugby League World Cup.

Achievements and accolades

Individual
Cronulla-Sutherland Sharks Monty Porter Medal: 2018
Cronulla-Sutherland Sharks Players' Player Award: 2018
Cronulla-Sutherland Sharks Members' Player of the Year: 2018
Cronulla-Sutherland Sharks Team of the Half Century: 2017
2017 Rugby League World Cup Team of the Tournament: 2017
NYC Team of the Year: 2014

Team
2016 NRL Grand Final: Cronulla-Sutherland Sharks – Winners
2017 Rugby League World Cup: Australia – Winners
2021 Rugby League World Cup: Australia – Winners

Statistics

NRL
 Statistics are correct to 14/09/22 of the 2022 season

International

State of Origin

American football career

In April of 2019, Holmes was signed by the New York Jets as part of the NFL's International Player Pathway program. He made appearances in the New York Jets preseason against the New York Giants on 9 August, carrying 3 times for 6 yards and receiving 3 times for 30 yards. Then the Atlanta Falcons on 15 August carrying 3 times for 3 yards. He did not play in the third game against the New Orleans Saints. In the fourth game against the Philadelphia Eagles he made 5 receptions for 55 yards. He was waived by the Jets during final roster cuts, but was added to the Jets' practice squad on 1 September 2019, as an exempt international player. He was released on 22 November 2019.

References

External links

North Queensland Cowboys profile
NRL profile
2017 RLWC profile

 

 

1995 births
Living people
Australian people of Cook Island descent
Australian people of Māori descent
Australian rugby league players
New Zealand Māori rugby league players
Cronulla-Sutherland Sharks players
Junior Kangaroos players
Rugby league fullbacks
Rugby league players from Townsville
Rugby league wingers
Queensland Rugby League State of Origin players
Australia national rugby league team players
New York Jets players
Australian players of American football
International Player Pathway Program participants
North Queensland Cowboys players
American football return specialists
American football running backs
Australian expatriate sportspeople in the United States
Expatriate players of American football